Siphopteron quadrispinosum is a species of small sea slug, a marine opisthobranch gastropod mollusc in the order Cephalaspidea, the headshield slugs. This slug is a simultaneous hermaphrodite.

Distribution
This species was originally identified in Hawaii (Kihei, Maui) and Papua New Guinea, and has a wide distribution throughout the western and central Pacific Ocean.

Description
Siphopteron quadrispinosum is a relatively small species of sea slug, growing to a maximum length of 5 mm. The body is bright yellow, and the siphon is orange-red in colour. The parapodia and siphon differ between the Papua New Guinean and Haiwaiian populations. Papua New Guinean specimens have the colouration of the siphon continuing along the posterior shield. Also, the parapodia are entirely yellow. In Hawaiian populations, the parapodia have a white margin and the orange-red colouration along the posterior shield is absent.

Eggs of this species are pale yellow and are laid in a flattened mass.

Habitat
Siphopteron quadrispinosum lives at depths of 6 to 27 metres on sand beds, and among Halimeda kanaloana, a species of macroalgae.

Behaviour
This slug can swim, and will do so when disturbed. It is active during the daytime.

Mating
Siphopteron quadrispinosum is a simultaneous hermaphrodite. During mating, each animal stabs the other with a penile stylet, a form of penile appendage, and injects prostate fluids.

References

External links
 Precopulatory stabbing, hypodermic injections and unilateral copulations  in a hermaphroditic sea slug, Nils Anthes & Nico K. Michiels (This link shows detailed anatomical images)
 Images (The top image is a Haiwaiian specimen, and the bottom images is a Papua New Guinean specimen)
 Image

Gastropteridae
Gastropods described in 1989